AAV or Aav may refer to:

Businesses
 Advantage Oil & Gas Ltd., a Canadian oil and gas company 
 Allah Valley Airport (IATA airport code), in Allah Valley, Mindanao, Philippines
 Arab American Vehicles, a car assembler in Egypt
 Armstrong Studios, an Australian recording studio later renamed AAV

Language
 African American Vernacular English 
 Austroasiatic languages, a language group of Southeast Asia

Military
 Anomalous Aerial Vehicle, a military term for an unidentified flying object
 Anti-aircraft vehicle, or self-propelled anti-aircraft weapon
 Assault Amphibious Vehicle or Amphibious Assault Vehicle, an amphibious tracked vehicle

People
 Aav (surname), Estonian surname
 Aníbal Acevedo Vilá, former governor of Puerto Rico (2005-2008)

Other uses 
 Adeno-associated virus, a nonpathogenic virus used as a gene therapy tool 
 Air admittance valve, a valve in a drain-waste-vent system 
 Aire d'attraction d'une ville, a metropolitan statistical area used by the French national statistics office INSEE
 Another Angry Voice, a British political blog 
 Vatican Apostolic Archive, Latin: Archivum Apostolicum Vaticanum